Tetreuaresta audax is a species of tephritid or fruit flies in the genus Tetreuaresta of the family Tephritidae.

Distribution
Mexico.

References

Tephritinae
Insects described in 1893
Diptera of North America